Peter Berger (born 16 October 1949) is a German rower who competed for West Germany in the 1968 Summer Olympics and in the 1972 Summer Olympics.

He was born in Konstanz.

In 1968 he was a crew member of the West German boat which finished twelfth in the coxed four event. He competed at the 1970 World Rowing Championships in St. Catharines in the coxed four and won gold. He competed at the 1971 European Rowing Championships and won a gold medal with the coxed four. In 1972 he won the gold medal with the West German boat in the coxed four competition.

References 

1949 births
Living people
Olympic rowers of West Germany
Rowers at the 1968 Summer Olympics
Rowers at the 1972 Summer Olympics
Olympic gold medalists for West Germany
Olympic medalists in rowing
West German male rowers
Medalists at the 1972 Summer Olympics
People from Konstanz
Sportspeople from Freiburg (region)
World Rowing Championships medalists for West Germany
European Rowing Championships medalists